The 2021 Black Sea incident was a diplomatic incident between Russia and the United Kingdom involving the British destroyer HMS Defender while it transited from Odesa, Ukraine, to Batumi, Georgia.

Background 
In 2014, Russia annexed the Crimean Peninsula. The British government does not recognise the annexation of Crimea.

Ukraine–United Kingdom naval agreement 
On 21 June 2021, the United Kingdom and Ukraine signed a naval cooperation agreement onboard  , whilst in port at Odesa, Ukraine. Under the terms of the agreement, the United Kingdom will sell two refurbished Sandown-class minehunters to Ukraine and produce eight small missile warships for the country. The United Kingdom will also construct a new naval base on the Black Sea as the primary fleet base for the Ukrainian Navy and a base on the Sea of Azov. The agreement also provided for the sale of missiles to Ukraine, and for training and support for these.

HMS Defender 
On 23 June 2021, the United Kingdom's HMS Defender undertook a freedom of navigation patrol through the disputed waters around the Crimean Peninsula.

In an account partially contradicted by the UK government, the Ministry of Defence of the Russian Federation and border guards said they fired warning shots from coast guard patrol ships and dropped bombs from a Sukhoi Su-24 attack aircraft in the path of Defender after, according to the Russian Defence Ministry, it had allegedly strayed for about 20 minutes as far as 3 km (2 miles) into waters off the coast of Crimea, which Russia annexed in 2014 in a move mostly unrecognised internationally. The UK military denied any warning shots were fired and said the ship was in innocent passage in Ukraine's territorial sea, later clarifying that heavy guns were fired three miles astern and could not be considered to be warning shots. BBC defence correspondent Jonathan Beale on board the vessel confirmed that the ship went to action stations prior to the transit; the crew put on flash protection in case of live fire; they were warned on the radio that the Russians would fire, and heard some firing in the distance. The Russian Ministry of Defence and the Russian Coastguard released two videos, one of them allegedly taken from a Russian fighter and the other from a patrol boat, showing that shots were actually fired near HMS Defender. This would be the first time that Russian forces had fired on a British warship since 1919. HMS Defender arrived in Batumi on 26 June. 

On 27 June, secret documents relating to the passage of HMS Defender through Ukraine's territorial waters were discovered at a bus stop in Kent. These documents revealed that the Royal Navy considered different hypothetical reactions from Russia in response to the ship's passage and was prepared for the possibility that Russia may respond in an aggressive manner. The documents showed the passage was a calculated decision by the British government to make a show of support for Ukraine. The senior civil servant who lost the files had his security clearance suspended. He had been due to become a United Kingdom ambassador to NATO.

HNLMS Evertsen 

From 15:30 to 20:30 on 24 June, the Russian Air Force conducted a series of "mock attacks" on the Dutch frigate  that had been patrolling in the Black Sea with HMS Defender. Russian Foreign Ministry spokesperson Maria Zakharova accused the frigate of "dangerous manoeuvring" that was a "deliberate provocation". In response, the British Ministry of Defence stated that "freedom of navigation is a fundamental right exercised by all nations".

Aftermath 
British Prime Minister Boris Johnson defended the decision to conduct the patrol as "entirely right". Deputy Russian Foreign Minister Sergei Ryabkov warned that Russia would drop bombs "not only in its path, but also on target" if British vessels were involved in future incidents. Russian President Vladimir Putin accused the United Kingdom of "deliberate provocation" and stated that the United States sent a plane to monitor the Russian response.

See also 
 1986 Black Sea incident
 1988 Black Sea bumping incident
 2003 Tuzla Island conflict
 2018 Kerch Strait incident
 2023 Black Sea drone incident

References

External links 
 BBC journalist reports from British warship as Russia "fires warning shots" from BBC News on YouTube
 Russia releases video allegedly showing HMS Defender from Russian aircraft from The Daily Telegraph on YouTube
 Boris Johnson says HMS Defender’s deployment ‘wholly appropriate’ from The Guardian on YouTube

Diplomatic incidents
Black Sea
Maritime incidents in 2021
2021 in the United Kingdom
2021 in Russia
Russia–United Kingdom military relations